Margarita Martínez López (born 11 June 1950) is a Mexican politician affiliated with the Institutional Revolutionary Party. As of 2014 she served as Deputy of the LIX Legislature of the Mexican Congress representing Nuevo León.

References

1950 births
Living people
People from Tampico, Tamaulipas
Women members of the Chamber of Deputies (Mexico)
Institutional Revolutionary Party politicians
Politicians from Tamaulipas
21st-century Mexican politicians
21st-century Mexican women politicians
Deputies of the LIX Legislature of Mexico
Members of the Chamber of Deputies (Mexico) for Nuevo León